Macarostola formosa is a moth of the family Gracillariidae. It is known from Australia (the Northern Territory, Queensland, New South Wales and Victoria) and New Zealand.

The larvae feed on Acmena smithii and Eugenia ventenatii. They probably mine the leaves of their host plant.

References

Macarostola
Moths described in 1862